Achmad Faris Ardiansyah (born 3 July 1993) is an Indonesian professional footballer who plays as a defender for Liga 1 club Dewa United.

Club career

Persegres Gresik United
Achmad Faris joined the squad for 2016 Indonesia Soccer Championship A. He made his debut against PS TNI in the third week of Indonesia Soccer Championship as a substitute.

Mitra Kukar
He was signed for Mitra Kukar to play in Liga 2 in the 2019 season.

Badak Lampung
In 2020, Achmad Faris signed a one-year contract with Indonesian Liga 2 club Badak Lampung. This season was suspended on 27 March 2020 due to the COVID-19 pandemic. The season was abandoned and was declared void on 20 January 2021.

Dewa United
In 2021, Achmad Faris signed a contract with Indonesian Liga 2 club Dewa United. He made his league debut on 28 September against RANS Cilegon at the Gelora Bung Karno Madya Stadium, Jakarta.

International career
Achmad Faris called up to Indonesia under-21 team and played in 2012 Hassanal Bolkiah Trophy, but failed to win after losing 0-2 from Brunei under-21 team.

Honours

Club
Sriwijaya U-21
 Indonesia Super League U-21: 2012–13
Sriwijaya 
 East Kalimantan Governor Cup: 2018
Dewa United
 Liga 2 third place (play-offs): 2021

International
Indonesia U-21
Hassanal Bolkiah Trophy runner-up: 2012

References

External links
 
 Achmad Faris Ardiansyah at Liga Indonesia

1993 births
Living people
People from Gresik Regency
Sportspeople from East Java
Indonesian footballers
Liga 1 (Indonesia) players
Liga 2 (Indonesia) players
Kalteng Putra F.C. players
Persegres Gresik players
Gresik United players
Sriwijaya F.C. players
Mitra Kukar players
Badak Lampung F.C. players
Dewa United F.C. players
Persita Tangerang players
Association football defenders